Abd Allah ibn Amr ibn Ghaylan al-Thaqafi was the Umayyad governor of Basra in 674. In 665 he served as the head of the shurta (elite troops) of the governor of Basra, al-Harith ibn Amr al-Azdi, who served a four-month term before being replaced by Ziyad ibn Abihi. Abd Allah was appointed by Caliph Mu'awiya I in place of Samura ibn Jundab. He served for six months and appointed Abd Allah ibn Hisn as the head of his shurta. During one of his Friday prayer sermons tribesmen of the Banu Dabba hurled stones at him, prompting him to have one of the assailants' hand amputated. Prompted by the Dabba's complaints about the amputation, Mu'awiya replaced Abd Allah with Ziyad's son Ubaydallah ibn Ziyad.

References

Bibliography

7th-century Arabs
Banu Thaqif
Umayyad governors of Basra